David Loney Bruce-Brown (August 13, 1887 New York City – October 1, 1912 Milwaukee, Wisconsin) was an American racecar driver.

Early life
David Loney Bruce-Brown was born on August 13, 1887, the son of George Bruce-Brown (b. 1844) and Arabella Loney (b. 1853) and the brother of William Bruce-Brown (b. 1886). His father had previously been married to Virginia Greenway McKesson (d. 1878), of the McKesson family, with whom he had two children, Catherine Wolfe Brown (b. 1877) and a son, George McKesson Brown (b.1878).  His paternal great-grandfather was George Bruce (1781–1866) and his maternal aunt, Mary Loney (1850–1936), married Frederick Roosevelt (1850–1916), the son of James I. Roosevelt.

He attended the Allen-Stephenson School in New York City, and then the Harstrom School in Norwalk, Connecticut, a prep school for Yale.

Racing career
Having bluffed his way into auto racing at the age of 18, he turned out to be a natural talent behind the wheel and won the 1908 Daytona Speed Trials. He then went on to win the American Grand Prize in both 1910 and 1911 as well as numerous other races. He also participated in the 1911 and 1912 editions of the Indianapolis 500.

He clocked in a 0.33 3-5 world's one-mile amateur straightaway record, beating the previous holder, William K. Vanderbilt Jr.'s record.

Death
Bruce-Brown was killed during practice, along with his mechanic Tony Scudelari, for the 1912 American Grand Prize and 8th running of the Vanderbilt Cup races, which were held in Milwaukee. His car was repaired and driven by Barney Oldfield in the Grand Prize to a 4th-place finish. The coroner's jury which investigated his death determined that the road that they were racing on was too narrow.

Indy 500 results

Gallery

References

External links

David Bruce-Brown at ChampCarStats.com
 
David Bruce-Brown Biography

1887 births
1912 deaths
Indianapolis 500 drivers
Grand Prix drivers
Racing drivers who died while racing
Sports deaths in Wisconsin
Racing drivers from New York City